Mogororo is a sub-prefecture of Sila Region in Chad.

References 

Populated places in Chad